is a Japanese manga series by Minetarō Mochizuki. It is a modern adaptation of Shūgorō Yamamoto's historical novel of the same name. It was serialized in Shogakukan's seinen manga magazine Weekly Big Comic Spirits from September 2012 to February 2015, with its chapters collected in four tankōbon volumes.

Publication
Chiisakobee, written and illustrated by Minetarō Mochizuki, is a modern adaptation of Shūgorō Yamamoto's historical novel of the same name. The manga was serialized in Shogakukan's seinen manga magazine Weekly Big Comic Spirits from September 3, 2012 to February 9, 2015.<ref></p><p></ref><ref></p></ref> Shogakukan collected its chapters in four tankōbon volumes, released from March 29, 2013 to March 30, 2015.

Volume list

Reception
Chiisakobee received an Excellence Award at the 17th Japan Media Arts Festival in 2013. The manga won the Fauve D'Angoulême - Prix de la Série at the Angoulême International Comics Festival in 2017.

References

Further reading

External links
 

Comics about orphans
Seinen manga
Shogakukan manga